Nanna Karthavya is a 1965 Indian Kannada-language film directed by Vedantam Raghavayya and produced by K. S. Sathyanarayan and R. Sundaram. The film stars J. Jayalalithaa, Kalyan Kumar, R. Nagendra Rao and Sandhya. The film has musical score by G. K. Venkatesh. The plot revolves around a widow (played by Jayalalithaa), who decides to stay with her in-laws, but in unable to regain her life after her husband's death.

Cast

Soundtrack

Music for the film was composed by G. K. Venkatesh. R. N. Jayagopal and Nanju Kavi wrote lyrics for the film's soundtracks. The soundtrack album consists of two tracks.

References

External links
 

1965 films
1960s Kannada-language films
Films scored by G. K. Venkatesh
Films about widowhood in India